Hyrule Warriors: Age of Calamity, known in Japan as  is a 2020 hack-and-slash game developed by Omega Force and published by Koei Tecmo in Japan and by Nintendo internationally for the Nintendo Switch. In the story, set 100 years before the events of The Legend of Zelda: Breath of the Wild, Link and Princess Zelda must gather allies across Hyrule to fend off forces led by the evil Calamity Ganon, who is attempting to revive himself and destroy the kingdom.

Like the original Hyrule Warriors (2014), Age of Calamity is a crossover mixing the world and characters of Nintendo's The Legend of Zelda series with the gameplay of Koei Tecmo's Dynasty Warriors series. Upon release, Hyrule Warriors: Age of Calamity received positive reviews for its gameplay, varied character playstyles, amount of content, visuals, soundtrack, characterization, and expansion of the Breath of the Wild setting. However, some criticized the technical performance, chiefly its inconsistent frame rate, and the story drew mixed responses, particularly the use of time travel elements. Age of Calamity shipped over 3 million copies worldwide in its first four days, making it the best-selling game in the entire Warriors franchise.

Gameplay

Like the previous Hyrule Warriors game, Age of Calamity mixes the hack-and-slash gameplay of Koei Tecmo's Dynasty Warriors franchise with the characters, locations, and other elements from Nintendo's Legend of Zelda series. The basic gameplay is participating in large-scale battles against enemies, while also completing objectives and taking strategic actions such as capturing bases and commanding troops.

In addition to retaining the combat, material crafting, and weapon-upgrade systems from Hyrule Warriors, the game incorporates environmental puzzle solving and the use of the Sheikah Slate tool and paraglider from Breath of the Wild. Players can upgrade their characters, complete missions and challenges, use resources to access new areas, build weapons, and cook foods that can be used as buffs. Weapons in this game are invulnerable and will not break over time, unlike in Breath of the Wild. The game's map is similar to the one for Breath of the Wild. Players can choose stages from it and use the Sheikah Tower to explore between regions. The game features 18 playable characters; 14 are obtained via progression in the main story, while four can be unlocked by completing various side quests. Besides the characters, players are also able to control the gigantic Divine Beasts to destroy large numbers of enemies. The maximum level is level 100.

The game also features compatibility with Nintendo's Amiibo figures, with the figures of the Four Champions relaunching alongside the game.

Plot

 
During the Great Calamity, a small Guardian awakens within Hyrule Castle. It escapes the destruction through a time portal but is followed by a portion of Calamity Ganon's Malice. Arriving in an alternate timeline before the Calamity began, the Guardian is reactivated by Link and Impa during a battle. They take it to engineers Purah and Robbie for study and learn that it came from a future in which Ganon reawakens and destroys Hyrule. To prevent this, King Rhoam assembles four pilots for the recently-discovered Divine Beasts – Mipha, Daruk, Urbosa, and Revali – and commands them, Link, and Zelda to find the Master Sword in Korok Forest.

The Champions encounter the dark prophet Astor, who seeks to revive and control Calamity Ganon, corrupting the Forest, but Link draws the Master Sword and forces him to withdraw. Purah's research reveals the presence of Sheikah transport towers hidden underground, and the Champions reactivate them and use them to lead a preemptive strike on the Yiga Clan's hideout in Gerudo Desert. Learning from the Guardian's records that Calamity Ganon will return on Zelda's seventeenth birthday, King Rhoam sends her to train in hopes of awakening her sealing magic in time and deploys the Divine Beasts to prepare for the Calamity's impending return.

Robbie and Purah are captured by Yiga spies while restoring the Guardian's memory, but it escapes with the Sheikah Slate and delivers it to Zelda just as the Calamity arrives. With Hyrule Castle besieged and the Sheikah Towers shut down across Hyrule, the Champions are ambushed in their Divine Beasts by Calamity Ganon's Blight Ganons, and King Rhoam seemingly sacrifices himself as Link, Zelda, and Impa escape the Castle. The Guardian summons Sidon, Yunobo, Riju, and Teba from the original timeline to assist Mipha, Daruk, Urbosa, and Revali, respectively, buying Link enough time to destroy the Blight Ganons. With the Champions saved and the Divine Beasts restored, they begin to clear the way to Hyrule Castle. To stop the timeline from changing, Astor kills many of the Yiga Clan and uses their life force to resurrect the four Blight Ganons, causing Yiga Clan leader Master Kohga and his right-hand-man Sooga to fight back against him. In Fort Hateno, Link is cornered by the revived Blights, but Zelda finally awakens her sealing magic to save him, forcing Astor to retreat. Master Kohga and the remnants of the Yiga Clan defect to Zelda's side in a bid to seek revenge against Astor, and on the Great Plateau, the group also discovers that King Rhoam survived.

After Zelda and King Rhoam reconcile, Purah uses the Sheikah towers to transport all their allies to Hyrule Castle for a full-scale assault against Calamity Ganon. Although the Divine Beasts weaken Ganon's spirit form, Astor arrives with Harbinger Ganon, the small Guardian from the current timeline infected with the Malice from the original timeline. After being defeated by Link, Zelda, and the Champions, Astor is consumed by Harbinger Ganon, who transforms into Calamity Ganon. Calamity Ganon corrupts the little Guardian and turns it against the group, forcing them to destroy it. Upon its defeat, Zelda remembers she activated the little Guardian as a child and named it Terrako, but Rhoam took it away so she would focus on her training. Zelda and her allies confront Calamity Ganon but are unable to damage him until Terrako uses the last of its strength to self-destruct, weakening Calamity Ganon. Now vulnerable, Calamity Ganon is defeated by Link, and Zelda uses her power to permanently seal him away. The future heroes are returned to their timeline while Link, Zelda, and their allies look out at the now peaceful Hyrule. In a secret ending, Purah and Robbie repair Terrako, reuniting Zelda with her friend.

Development
Age of Calamity was revealed in a trailer that was released in September 2020, presented by Zelda series producer Eiji Aonuma and Koei Tecmo producer Yosuke Hayashi. The game features the same art assets as Breath of the Wild, but uses the more combat-focused gameplay style of the previous Hyrule Warriors game. More information was revealed at the Tokyo Game Show on September 26.

The game came into fruition when Breath of the Wild'''s director Hidemaro Fujibayashi and art director Satoru Takizawa pitched the idea to Aonuma, who liked the idea and after discussions. Aonuma then approached Hayashi, a producer from Koei Tecmo, to make a new Hyrule Warriors about the events of the Great Calamity, which were mentioned but not properly shown in Breath of the Wild. Aonuma felt that the battles would complement well with the style of a Warriors game. Nintendo's Zelda developers worked more closely with the development team at Koei Tecmo than on Hyrule Warriors, providing advisement and assistance with gameplay, graphics, world, and dialogue.

During the Nintendo Treehouse Live gameplay presentation on October 7, Nintendo stated that the game will explore more backstories and relationships between characters, aspects that were not thoroughly examined in Breath of the Wild. At the end of that month, the demo became available to download from the Nintendo eShop, which includes the first chapter of the game. Kotaku noted from the demo that the game felt more connected to Breath of the Wild than to a Warriors title.

 Downloadable content 
Downloadable content (DLC) for the game was released throughout 2021 via an "Expansion Pass". A purchase bonus was made available on May 28, featuring a new weapon and costume for Link. The first wave of content, titled "Pulse of the Ancients", was released on June 18, and features an additional playable character (Battle-Tested Guardian), new weapon types for Link and Zelda, new challenges in the Royal Ancient Lab, and newly-added challenging enemies. The second wave of content, titled "Guardian of Remembrance", was released on October 29, and adds new story stages set during the events of the main game. "Guardian of Remembrance" also adds new battle skills for existing characters, and two additional characters: Purah and Robbie, who function as a single unit, and Sooga.

Reception
Critical responseAge of Calamity holds a score of 78 out of 100 on review aggregator website Metacritic, indicating "generally favorable reviews".

Four reviewers for Famitsu gave the game a total score of 36/40, the second-highest score for a 2020 Nintendo Switch game at that point of the year (with Animal Crossing: New Horizons receiving 38/40 in March of the same year). TJ Denzer of Shacknews gave the game a 9/10 rating, giving high praise to the gameplay, differences between character playstyles, and story; they called Age of Calamity as the most fleshed out and well-crafted Dynasty Warriors-style game. They claimed that the game expands upon Breath of the Wild masterfully in both the iconic battle locations of the game and the soundtrack that accompanies them.

Giving the game a 4/5 rating, Scott Baird of Screen Rant stated that the game "offers a fascinating look into the world of Breath of the Wild alongside great gameplay", praising the combat system which rarely feels repetitive or dull, the differences between the character playstyles, the "hundreds of hours worth of content", and the character development. However, he criticized the camera, which "tends to get stuck during the indoor stages, which is especially frustrating when trying to dodge enemy attacks". While Baird praised the game for offering "a fascinating look at the world of Breath of the Wild", he also pointed out that the setting "severely limits the types of enemies that the players will encounter [compared to the first Hyrule Warriors], and the few additions to the lore (like elemental variations of monsters) feel less than impressive". Michael Goroff of Electronic Gaming Monthly also gave the game a 4 out of 5 review, praising the game's gameplay, and use of the universe, style, and gameplay elements from Breath of the Wild, but was critical of the story's choice to feature time travel. In his review, Daniel Dell-Cornejo of Nintendo Wire gave Age of Calamity an 8.5, praising the gameplay, art style, cutscenes, music, and large roster but expressed disappointment with the story direction and occasional drops in framerate.

Sales
In the United Kingdom, the game placed sixth in physical sales during its launch week, selling nearly 324% more copies than Hyrule Warriors: Definitive Edition during the same timeframe in 2018. It also sold 173,215 physical copies within its first week of release in Japan, making it the second best-selling retail game of the week in the country. It was ultimately the 16th highest selling game in Japan for 2020. In the United States the game was the sixth best-selling game during its launch month.

Four days after its release, Koei Tecmo revealed that the game has shipped over 3 million digital and physical copies worldwide, becoming the best-selling Warriors game of all time and outselling all previous games in the entire Warriors franchise including all Dynasty Warriors games and their spin-offs, Fire Emblem Warriors, and the previous Hyrule Warriors games. The game has shipped over 3.5 million copies by the end of 2020. As of April 2021, the game has sold over 3.7 million units. As of January 2022, the game has sold 4 million units worldwide, making it one of the best-selling Switch games.

Legacy
Starting in January 2021, Impa, Master Kohga, and the Diminutive Guardian from Age of Calamity have cameo appearances as collectable Spirits in the crossover fighting game Super Smash Bros. Ultimate''.

Notes

References

External links
 
 
 

2020 video games
Action video games
Fantasy video games
Crossover video games
Video game prequels
Crowd-combat fighting games
Warriors (video game series)
Hack and slash games
Koei Tecmo games
Multiplayer and single-player video games
Nintendo Switch-only games
Single-player video games
Video games developed in Japan
Video games that use Amiibo figurines
Video games with downloadable content
Video games featuring female protagonists
Video games with cel-shaded animation
Video games scored by Kumi Tanioka
Video games set in castles
The Legend of Zelda spin-off games
Video games about time travel
Nintendo Switch games
Omega Force games